The International Carbon Action Partnership (ICAP) was founded in 2007 by more than 15 government representatives as an international cooperative forum, bringing together states and sub-national jurisdictions that have implemented or are planning to implement emissions trading systems (ETS). Then governor of California, Arnold Schwarzenegger, stated at ICAP's founding ceremony:

"This first of its kind partnership will provide more incentives for clean-tech investment and economic growth while not letting polluters off the hook. And it will help renew the health of our planet."

José Sócrates, the Portuguese prime minister further added that ICAP was launched in order to join carbon markets all over the world and by that be more successful in combating climate change.  ICAP includes members from the European Union Emission Trading Scheme (EU ETS), Western Climate Initiative (WCI), Regional Greenhouse Gas Initiative (RGGI), Australia, New Zealand, Norway, and the Tokyo Metropolitan Government.  Japan and Ukraine are observers. Member jurisdictions share best practices and discuss ETS design elements with a view to creating a well-functioning global carbon market. The rationale behind ICAP’s work is that linking carbon cap and trade systems would lead to economic, social and environmental benefits.

Structure 
ICAP functions as an open forum of governments and public authorities working on cap and trade systems. The main bodies of ICAP are the Plenary and the Steering Committee. The day-to-day work is supported by the ICAP Secretariat based in Berlin, Germany, under the guidance of the ICAP Co-Chairs.

Objectives 
 Share best practices and learning from each other’s experience of ETSs
 Help policy makers recognize ETS design compatibility issues and opportunities for the establishment of an ETS at an early stage
 Facilitate possible future linking of trading programs
 Highlight the key role of cap and trade as an effective climate policy response
 Build and strengthen partnerships amongst governments.

Activities 
ICAP’s work focuses on three pillars: technical dialog, ETS knowledge sharing and capacity building activities.

Technical dialog 
Relevant topics addressed under ICAP’s technical dialog include for example linking ETS, allocation methods, MRV, offsets and carbon leakage. Events under this work stream bring together representatives from ICAP jurisdictions with international and local experts to share their expertise on technical issues and to discuss measures to contribute to furthering a global carbon market.

ETS knowledge sharing 

ICAP acts as a knowledge sharing hub, disseminating knowledge on existing and planned ETS, as well as the general benefits and design aspects of an ETS. Addressing the growing demand for reliable and detailed information on emissions trading worldwide, ICAP developed an interactive ICAP ETS Map,  which offers an up-to-date overview on existing ETSs. Moreover, the ´ICAP Status Report: Emissions Trading Worldwide`  provides factsheets on all existing and planned ETSs, and includes infographics to allow for an easy comparison of systems.  Policymakers and carbon market experts also share their insight into key milestones in setting up and running an ETS. Additionally, ICAP also runs workshops and side events at the United Nations Climate Change Conferences.

Capacity building 
Since 2009, ICAP has also been actively engaged in capacity building for emerging and developing countries by organizing training courses for participants from emerging and developing countries on technical issues of designing and implementing carbon cap and trade systems.  As of February 2015, the ICAP alumni community consisted of 317 course participants from 39 countries.

Current members 
As of March 2022, ICAP had 33 full members and 7 observers.

Europe
Denmark, European Commission, France, Germany, Greece, Ireland, Italy, Netherlands, Norway, Portugal, Spain, United Kingdom, Switzerland, Sweden

North America
• Regional Greenhouse Gas Initiative Members (RGGI)
Maine, Maryland, Massachusetts, New York, Vermont

• Western Climate Initiative Members (WCI)
British Columbia, California, Manitoba, Ontario, Québec

• Other North American Jurisdictions 
Arizona, New Jersey, New Mexico, Oregon, Washington, Nova Scotia

Asia Pacific
Australia, New Zealand, Tokyo Metropolitan Government

Observers
Canada, Japan, Kazakhstan, Republic of Korea, Ukraine, Mexico, Singapore

ICAP Status Report 

ICAP's annual report, Emissions Trading Worldwide: Status Report, highlights the spread of emissions trading worldwide. With 17 systems operating in jurisdictions that vary largely in their geographical scope, economic profile and energy mix, the report showcases the diversity and flexibility of emissions trading.''

 2022 Status Report
 2021 Status Report
 2020 Status Report
 2019 Status Report
 2018 Status Report
 2017 Status Report
 2016 Status Report
 2015 Status Report
 2014 Status Report

References

External links 
 Official website
 Potsdam Institute for Climate Impact Research
 Regional Greenhouse Gas Initiative
 Western Climate Initiative

Climate change policy
Emissions trading
Intergovernmental environmental organizations
Environmental agencies
2007 establishments